was one of the most prominent yakuza godfathers.

Known as the "Godfather of Godfathers" and "The Japanese Godfather", Taoka was third kumicho of the Yamaguchi-gumi, Japan's largest yakuza organization, from 1946 to 1981.

Early life
Taoka, an orphan, grew up as a young street fighter in Kobe under the guidance of Noboru Yamaguchi, the Yamaguchi-gumi's boss. 

"I never wanted to be a yakuza. I used to work at Kawasaki Shipyard, but I got into a fight with my boss and quit the company, so I couldn't go home."

He earned his lifelong nickname "Kuma" ("the Bear") because of his signature attack of clawing at an opponent's eyes.

Career
He was imprisoned for murder from 1937 to 1943 and assumed the role of kumicho three years later, at the age of 33. A suggestion from a friend made Taoka realize that economic activities in the back alleys would come to a dead end. If you spread your hands, you will get into trouble and be interrogated by the police. High cost, low profit. After that, Taoka started a full-fledged port cargo handling business.

In his time as boss, Taoka expanded the Yamaguchi-gumi from a small strikebreaking gang on the Kobe docks to the world's largest criminal syndicate, with over 10,000 members during its peak. Notoriously suspicious and wary of rival yakuza clans, he notably refused to join the Kanto-kai, an inter-yakuza confederation in 1963. In 1972, following a period of tension between both gangs, Taoka forged an alliance between the Yamaguchi-gumi and the Inagawa-kai at a sakazuki ceremony at his home.

He had survived a 1978 assassination attempt when he was shot in the back of the neck by a member of the Matsuda-gumi (松田組), a rival gang to the Yamaguchi-gumi, during a limbo dance exhibition at a nightclub in Kyoto. His attacker was found dead several weeks later in some woods near Kobe.

Death
He led the Yamaguchi-gumi until his death from a heart attack in 1981.  His wife, Fumiko, briefly filled the gang's leadership role until a new kumicho, Masahisa Takenaka, was chosen in 1984.

Personal life
From 1983 to 1990, his daughter, Yuki (1964–), was married to Kitarō, a noted Japanese new-age musician. His son Mitsuru Taoka (1943–2012) was a producer of films in Japan and was married to actress Eiko Nakamura until her suicide at their home by gas poisoning in 1975.

References

Yakuza members
Yamaguchi-gumi
1913 births
1981 deaths
Japanese crime bosses
People from Tokushima Prefecture